All Black Peak is the main peak in the Crown Hills at the southeast end of the Lanterman Range of Victoria Land, Antarctica, rising to  on the east side of the head of Johnstone Glacier in the Bowers Mountains. It was named because of its color by the New Zealand Antarctic Place-Names Committee in 1983 on the suggestion of geologist M.G. Laird. The peak is situated on the Pennell Coast, a portion of Antarctica lying between Cape Williams and Cape Adare.

References
 

Mountains of Victoria Land
Pennell Coast